Joan Selverstone Valentine (born 1945) is a biological inorganic chemist and biochemist. Valentine's current work examines the role of transition metals, metalloenzymes, and oxidative stress in health. Her foremost expertise is superoxide anion and its functional enzyme superoxide dismutase. Valentine has been a member of the faculty of the University of California, Los Angeles since 1980. She served as Associate Editor of the journal Inorganic Chemistry from 1989 to 1995, and has served as Editor-in-Chief of Accounts of Chemical Research since 1994. In 2005, she was elected to the National Academy of Sciences.

Early life and education 
Joan S. Valentine was born in Auburn, California in 1945. In 1967, she graduated with a Bachelor of Arts in Chemistry from Smith College and a Ph.D. in Inorganic Chemistry from Princeton University in 1971, where she conducted inorganic photochemistry on dicobalt-dioxygen complexes. After a year as an Instructor at Princeton, she was appointed Assistant Professor of Chemistry at Rutgers University in New Brunswick in 1972.

Independent career 
In 1972, she moved to Rutgers University where she served as Assistant, Associate and Professor of Chemistry. In 1980, she moved to UCLA as Professor of Chemistry. From 1991 to 1994, she also served as Departmental Vice Chair for Research and Administration. Valentine served as Director of the UCLA Chemistry-Biology Interface Predoctoral Training Program from 1993 to 2001.

Awards 
Research Career Development Award, NIH (1976–1981)
Alpha Chi Sigma Faculty Research, UCLA (1985)
Smith Medal, Smith College (1991)
McCoy Award, Caltech (1996)
John C. Bailar, Jr. Medal for Research in Coordination Chemistry, University of Illinois (2004)
Glenn T. Seaborg Medal (2008)

References

External links 
Joan S. Valentine UCLA Summary
Voices of Inorganic Chemistry Interview

1945 births
Living people
21st-century American chemists
American women biochemists
20th-century American women scientists
21st-century American women scientists
University of California, Los Angeles faculty
Members of the United States National Academy of Sciences
People from Auburn, California
Smith College alumni
Princeton University alumni